NICE  may refer to:

Educational institutions
 National Institute for Health and Care Excellence in the UK
 Noorul Islam College of Engineering, a former name of Noorul Islam Centre for Higher Education (NICHE), Kumarakoil, India
 North Idaho College of Education, a former name of Lewis–Clark State College in Lewiston, Idaho

Other organizations and companies
 International (Nice) Classification of Goods and Services
 Nassau Inter-County Express, a bus system in Nassau County, New York
 National Independent Cadres and Elites, in Iraq
 National Information & Credit Evaluation, a Korean comprehensive credit information provider
 National Institute for Coordinated Experiments, a fictional organisation in C.S. Lewis' novel That Hideous Strength
 NICE Car Company, a distributor of electric vehicles in London
 NICE Ltd., an Israeli surveillance and data analytics company

Other
 Neutral Ion Coupling Explorer, a candidate Small Explorer program spacecraft
 NICE classification of colorectal polyps
 NICE Corridor, also known as the Bangalore–Mysore Infrastructure Corridor

See also
Nice (disambiguation)